The 1999 Men's EuroHockey Nations Championship qualification was the sixth edition of the qualifying round for the Men's EuroHockey Nations Championship. It took place from 5 to 12 July 1998 in three different venues with 17 teams playing for five quotas at the 1999 European Championship.

Dundee

The first qualifying tournament was played in Dundee, Scotland from 6 to 11 July 1998 with five teams participating.

Standings

Results

Alicante

The second qualifying tournament was played in Alicante, Spain from 6 to 12 July 1998 with eighth teams participating.

Preliminary round

Pool A

Pool B

Fifth to eighth place classification

5–8th place semi-finals

Seventh place game

Fifth place game

First to fourth place classification

Semi-finals

Third place game

Final

Final standings

(H) Host.

Prague

The third and last qualifying tournament was held in Prague, Czech Republic from 9 to 12 July 1998 with four teams participating.

Standings

Matches

References

Qualification
Men's EuroHockey Nations Championship qualification
EuroHockey Nations Championship qualification
EuroHockey Nations Championship qualification
EuroHockey Nations Championship qualification
EuroHockey Nations Championship qualification
EuroHockey Nations Championship qualification
1998 EuroHockey Nations Championship qualification
1998 EuroHockey Nations Championship qualification
1998 EuroHockey Nations Championship qualification
Sports competitions in Prague
1990s in Prague
Sport in Alicante
20th century in Dundee
Sports competitions in Dundee